Donald Lester Jackson (January 23, 1910 – May 27, 1981) was a U.S. Representative from California from 1947 to 1961.

Born in Ipswich, Edmunds County, South Dakota, Jackson attended the public schools of South Dakota and California.

Biography 
He served as a private in the United States Marine Corps from 1927 to 1931 and again from 1940 until discharged as a colonel in 1945 with two years' combat service overseas. He engaged in public relations, and worked as a reporter and editor in Santa Monica, California, from 1938 to 1940. He served as director of publicity for the  city of Santa Monica, in 1939 and 1940.

Jackson was a congressional adviser at the ninth conference of American States at Bogotá, Colombia in 1948 and was elected as a Republican to the Eightieth and to the six succeeding Congresses (January 3, 1947 – January 3, 1961). His congressional service included the House Un-American Activities Committee, and a notable role in accusing Methodist Bishop G. Bromley Oxnam of engaging in communist activities. He was not a candidate for renomination in 1960. Jackson voted in favor of the Civil Rights Acts of 1957, but did not vote on the Civil Rights Act of 1960.

Jackson was appointed to the House Un-American Activities Committee to replace future president Richard Nixon, who had just been elected to the United States Senate.

He worked as a radio and television commentator from 1960 to 1968, and was appointed by President Nixon as a commissioner on Interstate Commerce Commission in 1969.

Jackson resided in Sosua, Dominican Republic, West Indies, until his death in Bethesda, Maryland, May 27, 1981. He was interred in Arlington National Cemetery.

See also
 List of members of the House Un-American Activities Committee

References

1910 births
1981 deaths
American anti-communists
American Congregationalists
United States Marine Corps officers
Burials at Arlington National Cemetery
People from Ipswich, South Dakota
Military personnel from South Dakota
People from Santa Monica, California
United States Marine Corps personnel of World War II
Republican Party members of the United States House of Representatives from California
United States Marine Corps colonels
20th-century American politicians
Military personnel from California